The 1987 Embassy World Darts Championship was held at the Lakeside Country Club in Frimley Green, Surrey between 9 and 17 January 1987. John Lowe, the 1979 champion and four-time runner-up in the event, beat three-time defending champion Eric Bristow in a repeat of the 1981 and 1985 finals.

Seeds
  Eric Bristow
  John Lowe
  Mike Gregory
  Bob Anderson
  Dave Whitcombe
  Jocky Wilson
  Cliff Lazarenko
  Keith Deller

Prize money
The prize fund was £62,000.

Champion: £14,000
Runner-Up: £7,000
Semi-finalists (2): £3,500
Quarter-finalists (4): £2,900
Last 16 (8): £1,400
Last 32 (16): £700

There was also a 9 Dart Checkout prize of £52,000, along with a High Checkout prize of £1,000.

The results

1987 BDO World Youth Championship

Seeds
  Mark Day
  Shaun Greatbatch
  Rowan Barry
  Harith Lim

Semi-finals (best of 3 sets)
  Mark Day 1–2  Harith Lim
  Rowan Barry 2–1  Shaun Greatbatch

Final (best of 5 sets)
  Harith Lim 2–3  Rowan Barry

References

BDO World Darts Championships
Bdo World Darts Championship, 1987
Bdo World Darts Championship